Al-As ibn Wa'il was the father of the Sahaba 'Amr ibn al-'As and Hisham ibn al-A'as.

He was a part of Hilf al-Fudul.

He was rumored to have had a relationship with Layla bint Harmalah.

Surat al-Kawthar is the 108th surah of the Qur'an, and the shortest. According to Ibn Ishaq, it was revealed in Makka, some time before the Isra and Miraj, when A'as ibn Wa'il as-Sahmi said of Muhammad that he was "a man who is cut off (from having a male progenitor) is of no consequence, and if he were killed, he would be forgotten."

He never became a Muslim and left a will to his two sons.

References

External links
http://www.islaam.net/main/display.php?id=1126&category=13

Year of birth missing
Year of death missing
Sahabah ancestors
Banu Sahm
6th-century Arabs